Milton Margai College of Education and Technology (MMCET), formerly known as Milton Margai Teachers College (MMCET), is a technical university located in Freetown, Sierra Leone. It was established in 1963 and is named after Sierra Leone's first Prime Minister,  Sir Milton Margai. The university has become affiliated with the University of Sierra Leone, and has been upgraded to a degree-awarding status in selected subjects.

History

Milton Margai Teachers College
Milton Margai Teachers College was founded in 1963, and was originally housed at Tower Hill in Freetown. The mission of MMTC was to train teachers for the lower levels of secondary school (Forms 1 - 3).

Until 1967 graduates of MMCET were awarded either a Teacher's Certificate (TC), or a Teacher's Advanced Certificate (TAC). In 1967 a new three-year programme was introduced, the curriculum was restructured, and both the TC and TAC where phased out and replaced with the Higher Teachers Certificate (HTC).

Milton Margai College of Education
In 1995, in response to the needs of the new 6-3-3-4 system of education, a Bachelor of Education (B.Ed) degree programme was introduced. The 6-3-3-4 system involves six years of primary schooling, three years of junior secondary schooling (JSS), three years of senior secondary schooling (SSS), and four years of tertiary education. The Bachelor of Education degree programme was introduced in the specialist subject areas of Physical and Health education, Performing arts, Practical Arts, Technical Studies, Business Studies, Secretariat Studies, Integrated Science, Indigenous Languages (include the Mende, Temne, Limba and Krio), Community Development Studies, Social Studies and Religious and Moral Education. This significant restructuring of the curriculum meant a change in the depth and breadth of the education offered, and the name was changed to Milton Margai College of Education (MMCET) to reflect this.

Milton Margai College of Education and Technology
In 2000, Milton Margai College of Education merged with Freetown Technical Institute (FTI) at Congo Cross, and the Hotel and Tourism Training Institute at Brookfields, to become the Milton Margai College of Education and Technology. This latest restructuring transforms the college into a Polytechnic. The programmes at MMCET are divided into four faculties, Education, Engineering (Civil, Electrical, & Mechanical), Science and Technology, and Business and Management, including Hotel and Tourism.

The merger brought about a reconstruction of both staff and student administrative units. Within the staff unit, Dr. Dennis Kargbo was appointed Principal of the MMCET.

MMCET Programmes
Bachelor of Education
Bachelor of Technology
Bachelor of Commerce
Bachelor of Vocational Studies
Higher National Diploma
Higher Teachers Certificate
Higher National Certificate
National Diploma
National Certificate
National Trade Certificate
Trade Test Certificate
IT Diploma

References

External links
https://web.archive.org/web/20071124021908/http://www.mmosa.org/

Universities and colleges in Sierra Leone
Education in Freetown